The Martin Model 167 Maryland was an American medium bomber that first flew in 1939. It saw action in World War II with France and the United Kingdom.

Design and development

Martin's design was a twin-engine all-metal monoplane, capable of around 310 mph (500 km/h) with a crew of three. The XA-22 was not adopted for operational service in the U.S., because the contract was won by the Douglas DB-7, which became the A-20 Havoc, but Martin received foreign orders, and about 450 of the fast, twin-engined bombers were built.

The prototype Model 167W was powered by twin-row Pratt & Whitney R-1830-37 Twin Wasp engines, which were replaced in French production aircraft by single-row nine-cylinder Wright R-1820 Cyclone engines, although the Twin Wasps were then restored for the British Maryland. All versions of the Model 167 were armed with six machine guns, four fixed guns in the wings (mainly for ground-attack), one dorsal gun and one ventral gun. In the prototype, these guns were all 0.30 in Browning machine guns. The dorsal gun was mounted in a fully retractable turret. The French aircraft used license-built Belgian Fabrique Nationale FN-Brownings, and used a lighter semi-retractable dorsal turret.

The Model 167 was a fairly typical twin-engined bomber of the period. The most unusual feature of the Model 167 was the very narrow fuselage, although it was shared with a number of late prewar contemporaries. The crew of three was carried in two isolated compartments: the bombardier sat in the nose below the pilot and the gunner was in the mid-upper twin-machine gun turret in a separate rear compartment, isolated by a bulkhead.

Glenn L. Martin doubled the size of the Baltimore factory, and built all 115 aircraft in six months, but they were prevented from delivering them by a US government arms embargo. Despite that, the French placed an order for an additional 100 aircraft. The embargo was lifted in October 1939, and the 115 aircraft from the first order were delivered by late November 1939. Deliveries then slowed, and only 25 of the second batch reached France before the French surrender to the Germans.

Operational history

French service

Facing a massive German arms buildup and desperate for modern aircraft, the French Air Force purchased U.S. aircraft of numerous types in the late 1930s. Martin received an order for more than 200 167 Fs which incorporated French equipment such as metric instruments. French officials expected deliveries to begin in January 1939 but the type, locally called the Glenn Martin 167 A-3 entered service only in early 1940.

Because of the U.S. embargo on arms exports after the beginning of the war, many aircraft were impounded for two months before being shipped to Europe. When the Battle of France began, there were only four Groupes de bombardement (bomber squadrons) equipped. The Glenns were quickly sent to the front lines where they performed well with their adequate speed and excellent manoeuvrability for an aircraft in this class. In about 400 sorties, they suffered a 4 per cent loss rate, much better than the 16 per cent endured by LeO 451 crews against similar targets.

Immediately before the June 1940 Armistice, units flying the Glenn Martin 167 were evacuated to French North Africa to avoid capture by the Germans. One of them landed in Spain and was interned, being tested by the Spanish Air Force.  Some examples were transferred to the Aéronautique Navale. During Vichy rule of the French empire, French Martins bombed British Commonwealth forces, most notably during the Syria–Lebanon campaign of 1941. Following Operation Torch in 1943, M.167s were replaced with more modern Allied types, including the Martin B-26 Marauder. Approximately 215 Martin 167s were delivered to France.

British service

Just before the Franco-German Armistice, the remaining 75 aircraft on the French order were signed over to the United Kingdom; 32 Marylands had been completed to French specifications and were converted to British requirements in the UK. Engines were changed from the Cyclone 9 to the Pratt and Whitney Twin Wasp and various weapons and instruments were replaced. The last 43 of the order were completed as required by Glenn Martin. All these aircraft became the Maryland Mk.I. A further 150 aircraft had been ordered directly by Britain with two-speed superchargers on their Twin Wasps as the Maryland Mk.II.

Many of the aircraft were shipped to Egypt and Malta in time for the 1941 fighting there. The RAF used the aircraft mainly for photo-reconnaissance operations in North and East Africa, it being faster than the Bristol Blenheim. A Maryland bomber photographed the Italian fleet before and after the Battle of Taranto on 11 November 1940. The pilot, Adrian Warburton, scored his five confirmed kills with the Maryland's forward-firing guns.

Seven Maryland Mk.Is were transferred to the British Fleet Air Arm and were mainly used for target towing duties. On 22 May 1941, a Maryland of 771 Naval Air Squadron based at Hatston in the Orkney Islands, reported that the German battleship Bismarck had left Bergen, confirming that she was breaking out into the Atlantic.

Operators

 Armée de l'Air
 Aéronavale
 Free French Air Force
 Vichy French Air Force

 South African Air Force
 No. 12 Squadron SAAF
 No. 16 Squadron SAAF
 No. 21 Squadron SAAF
 No. 24 Squadron SAAF

 Royal Air Force
 No. 39 Squadron RAF
 No. 69 Squadron RAF
 No. 203 Squadron RAF
 No. 223 Squadron RAF
 Fleet Air Arm
 771 Naval Air Squadron

Specifications (Maryland Mk I)

See also

Notes

Bibliography
 Bishop, Chris. The Encyclopedia of 20th Century Air Warfare. London: Amber Books Ltd, 2004. .
 Cuny, Jean. "Glenn Martin 167 in French Service". Journal of American Aviation Historical Society. Volume 10, No. 1, Spring 1965.

 
 
 Mondey, David. American Aircraft of World War II (Hamlyn Concise Guide). London: Bounty Books, 2006. .
 Munson, Kenneth. Fighters and Bombers of World War II: 1939–45. London: Blandford Press Ltd, 1969. .
 
 
 
 Wagner, Ray. "American Combat Planes, Third Enlarged Edition". New York: Doubleday & Company, 1982, pp. 178–179. .

External links

 Fleet Air Arm Archive article
 "The French Martin" a 1940 Flight article

1930s United States attack aircraft
Maryland
Mid-wing aircraft
Aircraft first flown in 1939
Twin piston-engined tractor aircraft